DiscJuggler was a professional CD/DVD recording software program, able to duplicate multiple CDs at once with its ability to simultaneously drive multiple CD recorders and replicate virtually any existing standard CD. It is widely used for burning Dreamcast disc images, known by having a .cdi file extension.

See also
 Standard (warez)#Dreamcast

References

External links
 
 Company dissolved in 2020

Windows-only software
Optical disc authoring software